Arthur Herman Bader (September 21, 1886 – April 15, 1957) was a Major League Baseball player. Bader played for the St. Louis Browns in the 1904 season. In two games, he had no hits in three at-bats, playing the outfield. He batted and threw right-handed.

Bader was born and died in St. Louis, Missouri.

References

External links

1886 births
1957 deaths
Baseball players from St. Louis
St. Louis Browns players
Colorado Springs Millionaires players
Pueblo Indians players
Des Moines Boosters players